Björn Engquist (also Bjorn Engquist; born 2 June 1945 in Stockholm) has been a leading contributor in the areas of multiscale modeling and scientific computing, and a productive educator of applied mathematicians.

Life
He received his PhD in numerical analysis from University of Uppsala in 1975, and taught there during the following years while also holding a professorship at the University of California, Los Angeles. In 2001, he moved to Princeton University as the Michael Henry Stater University Professor of Mathematics and served as the director of the Program in Applied and Computational Mathematics. He has also been professor at the Royal Institute of Technology in Stockholm since 1993, and is director of the Parallel and Scientific Computing Institute. Engquist currently holds the Computational and Applied Mathematics Chair I at the Institute for Computational Engineering and Sciences at the University of Texas at Austin, after leaving Princeton in 2005.

Research
His research field is computational and applied mathematics and numerical methods for differential equations with applications to multi-scale modeling, electromagnetism, and fluid mechanics. Engquist has authored more than 100 scientific publications and advised 31 PhD students.

Awards
He is a recipient of numerous distinctions and awards: a member of the American Academy of Arts & Sciences, a member of the Royal Swedish Academy of Sciences and the Royal Swedish Academy of Engineering Sciences, and an invited speaker at the International Congress of Mathematicians (1982 and 1998), European Congress of Mathematics (1992), and European Congress of Fluid Mechanics (1991). He received the first SIAM James H. Wilkinson Prize in Numerical Analysis and Scientific Computing (1982), Peter Henrici Prize (2011), and George David Birkhoff Prize (2012). He was selected to the Norwegian Academy of Science and Letters in 2011.

References

External links
Homepage at the Royal Institute of Technology in Stockholm
Homepage at the University of Texas at Austin

1945 births
Living people
Numerical analysts
University of Texas at Austin faculty
KTH Royal Institute of Technology alumni
University of California, Los Angeles faculty
Uppsala University alumni
Princeton University faculty
Computational fluid dynamicists
20th-century Swedish mathematicians
21st-century Swedish mathematicians
Members of the Royal Swedish Academy of Sciences
Members of the Norwegian Academy of Science and Letters
Fellows of the Society for Industrial and Applied Mathematics